Samuel Ferreira Fraguito (born 8 September 1951) is a former Portuguese footballer who played midfielder.

|}

External links 
 
 

1951 births
Living people
People from Vila Real, Portugal
Portuguese footballers
Primeira Liga players
Boavista F.C. players
Sporting CP footballers
Ermesinde S.C. players
Association football midfielders
Portugal international footballers
Sportspeople from Vila Real District